Fort Mill School District, officially known as York County School District 4, is a public school district in Fort Mill, South Carolina, United States. It also serves students from Lake Wylie and Tega Cay.

Schools 
The district is currently made up of eleven elementary schools, six middle schools, and three high schools. Below is a complete list of component schools:

Elementary
 Doby's Bridge Elementary School
 Fort Mill Elementary School
 Gold Hill Elementary School
 Kings Town Elementary School 
 Orchard Park Elementary School
 Pleasant Knoll Elementary School
 River Trail Elementary School 
 Riverview Elementary School
 Springfield Elementary School
 Sugar Creek Elementary School
 Tega Cay Elementary School

Middle
 Banks Trail Middle School
 Forest Creek Middle School 
 Fort Mill Middle School
 Gold Hill Middle School
 Pleasant Knoll Middle School
 Springfield Middle School

High
 Fort Mill High School
 Nation Ford High School
 Catawba Ridge High School

Awards 
In 2000, Fort Mill High School was awarded New American High School designation meaning the United States Department of Education recognized it as one of the nation's best high schools and a model to other schools.

References 

York County